Cumann Naomh Peregrine is a Gaelic Athletic Association club in Clonsilla, Fingal, Ireland. It was founded in 1978 when a group of local people got together with Fr. Joe Madden of the Servite Order and decided to form a GAA club of their own.

The club caters for a range of age groups from four years upwards in the parishes of Hartstown, Huntstown, Porterstown, Blakestown and Mountview.

St Peregrines has a 500-seater spectator stand, a gym, astro turf and sports hall. Local rivals include St Brigid's and Castleknock.

The adult football team competes in AFL3 and also competes in the Dublin Senior Football Championship, having won the IFC in 2006. The senior hurlers compete in AHL3 and the Intermediate Hurling Championship.

The club is humorously referred to as " The Penguins" because of its strip.

Notable players

 Eric Lowndes
 David McGovern - Leitrim inter-county hurler
 Conor Hynes - under-20 Dublin squad member

Honours
 Dublin Intermediate A Camogie Championship: Winners 2022
 Dublin LGFA Junior B Football Championship: Winners 2021
 Dublin Intermediate Football Championship: Winners 2006
 Dublin Junior Football Championship: Winners 1998
 Dublin AFL Div. 6: Winners 2012, 2015
 Dublin AFL Div. 9: Winners 2007
 Dublin AFL Div. 11N: Winners 2013
 Dublin Minor D Hurling Championship Winners 2017

References

External links
Official website

1978 establishments in Ireland
Gaelic games clubs in Fingal
Gaelic football clubs in Fingal
Hurling clubs in Fingal